The Siberian nuthatch (Sitta arctica) is a bird species of the family Sittidae. For a long time considered as a subspecies of the Eurasian nuthatch (S. europaea), it was clearly differentiated in 2006 on the basis of morphological and molecular characters. It is on average larger than the Eurasian nuthatch and also differs in some morphological features such as the shape of its bill, the size of its claws and the color of its underwing and outer rectrices. Its song has also been described as "distinctly different" from that of the Eurasian nuthatch, though without further clarification. 

The Siberian nuthatch inhabits the forests northeast of Lake Baikal, up to the Bering Sea and the Sea of Okhotsk, but not near the coast. It lives in northwestern Siberia, barely exceeding the 105th meridian east in the west. It lives in larch stands and flood plains. The Siberian nuthatch has a wide range and its numbers are presumed to be stable, so the International Union for Conservation of Nature considers the bird to be of "least concern".

Taxonomy 

The Siberian nuthatch was described in 1907 under its current name S. arctica, by the Russian ornithologist Sergei Buturlin, based on a specimen (holotype) from Verkhoïansk. In 1916, Buturlin proposed a division of the family Sittidae into several subfamilies, genera and subgenera. He placed Sitta arctica within a monotypic genus, Arctositta (Buturlin, 1916), judging that its morphology is sufficiently distinct from other nuthatches. In 1928, German ornithologist Otto Kleinschmidt linked the genus Arctositta to the Eurasian nuthatch group (S. europaea), and the Siberian nuthatch was subsequently considered a subspecies Sitta europaea arctica of the Eurasian nuthatch.

In 2006, ornithologists Yaroslav Red'kin and Maria Konovalova published a comprehensive review of the East Asian subspecies of the Eurasian nuthatch, proposing the subspecies S. e. arctica to be elevated to species status, in recognition of its clearly distinct morphology from the other subspecies and the fact that the Siberian nuthatch lives in partial sympatry with Sitta europaea while showing little or no hybridization. The split was accepted by the British Ornithologists' Union in 2012. These morphological analyses are consistent with mitochondrial DNA analyses also performed in 2006, which showed a large divergence (10% for the ND2 gene) between arctica and europaea. The decision was followed by the ornithologists Nigel J. Collar and John D. Pilgrim in 2007 and taken up by the International Ornithological Congress in its version 1.6 (30 June 2008). German ornithologist Hans Edmund Wolters proposed the division of the genus Sitta into subgenera in 1975–1982. The Siberian nuthatch is placed in Sitta (Sitta) (Linnaeus, 1758). According to the International Ornithological Congress and Alan P. Peterson, no subspecies are distinguished.

Phylogeny 
In 2014, Eric Pasquet and colleagues published a phylogeny based on nuclear and mitochondrial DNA of 21 nuthatch species. Within the "europaea" group, the white-tailed nuthatch (S. himalayensis) – and hence the white-browed nuthatch (S. victoriae), although not included in the study – appears to be basal, and the Eurasian nuthatch is related to the chestnut-vented nuthatch (S. nagaensis) and the Kashmir nuthatch (S. cashmirensis). Indian nuthatch (S. castanea), Beautiful nuthatch (S. cinnamoventris), Burmese nuthatch (S. neglecta) and Siberian nuthatch are not included in the study. The "europaea" group is a sister group to the two rock nuthatches, the western rock nuthatch (S. neumayer) and the eastern rock nuthatch (S. tephronota), and these two clades diverged from each other thirteen million years ago. In 2020, a new phylogeny was published covering the genus more comprehensively: it includes more than four species mentioned above and uses three mitochondrial and two nuclear genes. The three species from South Asia (Indian, beautiful and Burmese nuthatches) are found to be related to the Kashmir nuthatch, but surprisingly, the Siberian nuthatch is recovered in an own branch that is quite distant from the Eurasian nuthatch of which it was long considered a subspecies. 

The simplified cladogram below is based on the phylogenetic analysis of Packert and colleagues (2014):

Biogeography 
In 1996, the Russian ornithologist Vladimir Leonovitch and his collaborators proposed a biogeographical hypothesis to explain the differentiation of nuthatches in northeast Siberia. During the Pleistocene glaciations, certain glacial refuges seem to have allowed the survival of at least parts of the Siberian fauna and flora. Populations related to Sitta europaea could have survived in these refuges, in this case the Anadyr basin, where Sitta arctica could have differentiated, and southern Kamchatka, where the subspecies S. e. albifrons could have diverged from the other subspecies of the Eurasian nuthatch.

Description 
The  are bluish-grey and the  brilliant white. It is quite similar to the white-breasted subspecies of the Eurasian nuthatch encountered in the most northern regions of Eurasia, but is characterized by a larger average size and by several anatomical particularities that are more or less easy to identify. The upperparts are dull blue-grey, as in the S. europaea amurensis subspecies, but darker than in all other Eurasian nuthatch subspecies. The  is black, thinner and shorter than in the latter. Red'kin and Konovalova of the Moscow Museum say there is no clear mark on the forehead and above this black line, although such a mark is present in some subspecies of S. europaea. Unlike S. europaea, the rufous brown of the rump extends further down the flanks; the underwing-coverts are dark gray (not pale), the outer rectrices are white for more than half their length, and there is no apparent sexual dimorphism.

The Siberian nuthatch's  is longer and narrower than in the various subspecies of the Eurasian nuthatch, with its upper margin completely or almost straight and its lower margin curved upward. The base of the bill is densely covered with long feathers. The wing is more pointed than in the Eurasian nuthatch, and the seventh primary remige is equal in size to the second, whereas it is smaller than the latter in the Eurasian nuthatch. The  is shorter (in absolute terms) than in all subspecies of the European nuthatch, but the hind claw is clearly more developed, equalling the remainder of its toe in length (around ).

Ecology and behavior 
During fall and winter, the Siberian nuthatch migrates, forming mixed-species foraging flocks with the Eurasian nuthatch subspecies S. e. asiatica and S. e. baicalensis.

Vocalizations
The Siberian nuthatch's song is powerful. Some sonograms of calls and songs of the Siberian nuthatch were published in 1996, and the voice is described as "distinctly different" from that of the Eurasian nuthatch, but without further specification.

Breeding
Available data on the ecology of the species are very patchy. Observations in 1994 showed that pairs had already formed by May 15. Like other nuthatches, notably the Eurasian nuthatch, this species occasionally reuses the nest of a Great spotted woodpecker (Dendrocopos major) and plasters the entrance with mud in order to reduce its diameter. The young observed fledged between June 30 and July 4.

Distribution and habitat 
The Siberian nuthatch is endemic to Russia and lives in central and northeastern Siberia. In the west, its distribution begins around the 105th meridian east, near the upper reaches of the Nizhnyaya Tunguska River and Vilyuy River in the north (to around the 65th or 67th parallel north) and those of the Lena River in the south. In the east it does not go beyond the lower reaches of the Anadyr River, the northwestern Koryak Mountains and the sources of the Punjina River. The distribution of the Siberian nuthatch does not reach the coastal areas, neither the Bering Sea nor the  Sea of Okhotsk. The main part of its distribution ends in the south, where the distribution of the Eurasian nuthatch subspecies asiatica begins, and in the east it is replaced in the Kamchatka peninsula by S. e. albifrons.

The Siberian nuthatch inhabits larch forests (Larix sp.) but also floodplains.

Status and threats 
The threat level of the Siberian nuthatch is assessed by the  International Union for Conservation of Nature in October 2016, which considers the species to be of "least concern". Indeed, according to BirdLife International data the range of this bird is vast, covering , and its population is large and stable, not warranting the assumption of a higher threat level.

Notes

Nuthatches
Endemic fauna of Russia
Birds described in 1907
Taxa named by Sergei Buturlin